Hormizd II Kushanshah (also spelled Hormozd or Ohrmazd), was Kushanshah of the Kushano-Sasanian Kingdom from 300 to 303. Like his predecessors, he was, in effect a governor of the Sasanian Empire for the eastern regions of Marw, Tukharistan and Gandhara which had been captured following the defeat of the Kushan Empire in 230. Since the reign of his predecessor Hormizd I Kushanshah, copper drachms were minted with the names of two local governors, Meze and Kavad.

Hormizd II Kushanshah may have been same person as Hormizd II, the King of Kings of the Sasanian Empire from 303 to 309. They both minted coins where they were depicted with a winged crown, whilst on the reverse of the Sasanian coins, which usually shows the traditional fire altar flanked by two attendants, also shows a head emerging from the fire, a typical Kushano-Sasanian design which first appears on Sasanian coins during the reign of Hormizd II.

References

Sources 
  
  

Kushanshahs
4th-century monarchs in Asia
4th-century Iranian people
Monarchs of the Kushano-Sasanian Kingdom